Horacio Martínez may refer to:

 Horacio Martínez (baseball) (born 1915), Dominican shortstop and second baseman
 Horacio Martínez (footballer) (born 1987), Argentine forward
 Horacio Martínez Meza (born 1972), Mexican politician